Miullen Nathã Felício Carvalho (born 19 May 1998), known simply as Miullen, is a Brazilian professional footballer who plays as a forward for Primeira Liga club Gil Vicente.

Professional career
Miullen moved to the youth academy of Corinthians in 2012, and transferred to Londrina in 2017. Miullen made his professional debut with Londrina in a 1-1 Campeonato Paranaense tie with Cianorte on 4 February 2018. On 22 August 2020, Miullen signed with Gil Vicente in the Primeira Liga.

External links

References

1998 births
Living people
People from Uberlândia
Brazilian footballers
Association football forwards
Primeira Liga players
Londrina Esporte Clube players
Associação Chapecoense de Futebol players
Gil Vicente F.C. players
Brazilian expatriate footballers
Brazilian expatriates in Portugal
Expatriate footballers in Portugal
Sportspeople from Minas Gerais